Milosav Jelić (Skobalj (Smederevo), Kingdom of Serbia, 13 March 1883 – Belgrade, Yugoslavia, 6 July 1947) was a Serbian chetnik active in Old Serbia and Macedonia. He was also a writer, war poet and one of the leading Belgrade journalists at the daily newspaper Politika before World War II.

Biography
Born in Skobalj (Smederevo) to Serbian parents. After he graduated from the Belgrade gymnasium in 1903, he studied military history at the Military Academy in Belgrade. After he graduated, he joined the Serbian Chetnik Organization, participated in the Balkan Wars of 1912 and 1913 and the Great War. Later, he was assigned to a diplomatic legation. In the 1920s he joined the largest daily newspaper in Belgrade – Politika (Politics).

During the Macedonian struggle and the Fight in Velika Hoča in particular,  Milosav Jelić, published the poem Kujundžića majka (Kujundžić's Mother) in the collection of Srbijanski venac (Serbian Garland), memorializing voivode Lazar Kujundžić. In the same book, he wrote a poem about Stojan Koruba. He also immortalized volunteer, Podnarednik (Lance sergeant) Mihajlo Jovanović for his acts of bravery at the height of World War I in 1917. That poem and many others garnered him a reputation as a war poet. He also co-wrote the lyrics for Stanislav Binički's popular composition – March on the Drina – with Miloje Popović.

Legacy
Jelić fell out of favor in Communist times because of his support of the Old Order and association with the Chetnik movement, but now people want to celebrate him and his work again.

Works
 Letopis Juga: Listine: Zapisi: Dnevnik: Pomenik. Belgrade, 1930
 Srbijanski venac, Novi Sad, 1919, Belgrade, 1931
 Albanija: zapisi o ljudima i dogadjajima, Belgrade, 1933
 Knjiga Stihova, Belgrade, 1937

See also
 List of Chetnik voivodes
 Radoje Pantić

References

1883 births
1947 deaths
20th-century journalists
20th-century Serbian poets
Chetniks
People from Podunavlje District
Serbian journalists
Serbian male poets
Serbian military personnel of the Balkan Wars
Serbian military personnel of World War I